WaterTower Music (formerly New Line Records from 2000 to 2010) is an American record label serving as the in-house music label and run by entertainment company Warner Bros., ultimately owned by Warner Bros. Discovery. The name and logo are based on the iconic Warner Bros. Water Tower.

History 
It was founded in 2000 as New Line Records by Jason Linn.

On January 15, 2010, New Line Records was renamed as WaterTower Music with Linn now also reporting to Paul Broucek, president, music, Warner Bros. Pictures. In March 2010, the company switched distribution from Warner Music Group's Alternative Distribution Alliance to Fontana, Universal Music Group's independent distributor.

In 2019, the distribution changed back to ADA, effectively reuniting WMG with former parent Warner Bros.

Releases

Artists 

 Hans Zimmer
 Junkie XL aka Tom Holkenborg
 Howard Shore
 Ryan Shore
 Ramin Djawadi
 Lorne Balfe
 Steven Price
 Ludwig Göransson
 John Powell
 Daniel Pemberton
 Andrew Lockington
 Michael Giacchino
 Thomas Newman
 Danny Elfman
 Joseph Bishara
 Christophe Beck
 Alexandre Desplat
 Rupert Gregson-Williams
 Mychael Danna
 Jeff Danna
 Mark Mothersbaugh
 James Horner
 Max Richter
 John Murphy

Soundtracks

New Line Records

WaterTower Music 

 About Schmidt
 Animaniacs
 Animaniacs (2020)
 Batman: Arkham City
 Batman Begins (originally on Warner Bros. Records)
 Batman: The Brave and the Bold
 Batman: Under the Red Hood
 Birth
 Bugs Bunny at the Symphony
 The Dark Knight
 The Dark Knight Rises
 A Dirty Shame
 Elf
 Four Christmases
 Game of Thrones season 3, 4, 5, 6, 7 and 8
 Harry Potter and the Half-Blood Prince
 Harry Potter and the Deathly Hallows: Part 1
 Harry Potter and the Deathly Hallows: Part 2
 A History of Violence
 The Hobbit: An Unexpected Journey
 The Hobbit: The Desolation of Smaug
 The Hobbit: The Battle of the Five Armies
 House of the Dragon
 Injustice: Gods Among Us
 Justice League: Crisis on Two Earths
 Monster-in-Law
 The Notebook
 Red Riding Hood
 Secondhand Lions
 Snakes on a Plane: The Album
 Son of the Mask
 Superman/Batman: Public Enemies
 The Upside of Anger
 Wedding Crashers
 Westworld
 Steven Universe: The Movie

See also 
 List of record labels
 Warner Records
 Warner Sunset Records

References

External links 
 

2000 establishments in California
American companies established in 2000
American record labels
Companies based in Burbank, California
Labels distributed by Warner Music Group
Record labels based in California
Record labels established in 2000
Soundtrack record labels
Warner Bros. divisions